The Àrea Metropolitana de Barcelona (AMB; "Metropolitan Area of Barcelona") is a public body operating on the principle of metropolitan authority. It is composed of representatives of Barcelona and 36 adjacent municipalities accounting for a population of 3,239,337 (Idescat, 2014) within an area of 636 km2. Its jurisdiction constitutes the main core of the unofficial Barcelona metropolitan area, with a population over 5 million.

Executive Bodies
The three executive bodies are:
 Mancomunitat de Municipis (Union of Municipalities): Covering 31 municipalities, it manages common services affecting public spaces, infrastructure, facilities, urbanism and housing for 3,029,389 inhabitants in an area of 495 km2. Given the range of services it offers, it is often construed as the core of the AMB.
 Entitat del Transport (Transport Authority): Covering 18 municipalities, it serves a population of 2,790,803 in an area of 332 km2. These make up the strict Barcelona conurbation. Created to jointly manage public transport within its area.
 Entitat del Medi Ambient (Environment Authority): Covering 33 municipalities it serves a population of 3,121,795 in an area of 583 km2. Entrusted with water supply and waste management for the area.

Powers

Territorial 
The AMB is responsible for three areas: territorial planning, urban planning and infrastructures of metropolitan interest.

Territorial planning 
 Participation in the preparation and proceeding of the general territorial Plan of Catalonia.
 Participation in the preparation and monitoring of the partial territorial plans that affect its area and the sectoral territorial plans that affect its powers.
 Preparation of plans, charters and programmes for the protection, management and planning of landscape.

Urban planning 
 Integrated urban planning of the metropolitan territory by means of the Metropolitan Urban Master Plan (PDUM) and the Metropolitan Urban Planning Plan (POUM). The AMB is responsible for the initiative for the formulation and initial and provisional approvals of both plans and their subsequent amendments.
 Participation in the Urban Planning Commission of the Metropolitan Area of Barcelona.
 Formulation and approval of the initial and provisional pluri-municipal urban development programmes.
 Formulation and approval of derived planning elements having metropolitan interest or affecting several municipalities.
 Urban management of the PDUM and the POUM as a competent and acting Administration. 
 Protection of urban legality by delegation of municipalities or replacement of municipal authority. Exercise of sanctioning powers, where appropriate.
 Cooperation and legal and financial support to municipalities concerning with planning, action programmes, projects and works, and urban discipline.

Metropolitan infrastructure 
 Execution and management of infrastructure related to mobility, parks, beaches, natural areas, equipment, resources, facilities, technical environmental services and supplies services.

Transport and mobility 
The AMB plans and manages bus networks and other public transport, except for trams.

Its powers, apart from planning and management, are:
 Urban surface public transport, except for trams.
 Mmetro and underground public transportation.
 Regulation of the taxi service.
 Approval of the Urban Mobility Metropolitan Plan. Definition of the basic metropolitan road network. Participation in traffic management in this network, together with the Catalan Government.
 Planning and management of passenger transportation with tourist and cultural purposes, delegated by town councils.
 Promotion of sustainable transport.
 Management of the Barcelona ring roads.

Environment and sustainability 
Environmental and sustainability powers include the water supply and treatment, waste management and management of the environment.

Water cycle 
 Home supply of drinking water or domestic water supply downstream.
 Purification of water collected for its use.
 Wastewater purification.
 Regeneration of purified wastewater for other uses such as irrigation or aquifers recharging.
 Coordination of water treatment municipal systems, including the planning and integrated management of rainwater and wastewater evacuation, and of the sewage.
 Regulation of the corresponding fees.
Waste
 Treatment of municipal waste products and products resulting from works, as well as its recovery (reuse and recycling of paper, metal, plastic and other materials, energy and compost production, etc.) and disposal (controlled discharge of non-recyclable waste products).
 Coordination of municipal collection systems.
 Picking and selection of containers.
 Waste recycling facility, in collaboration with municipalities.
Other powers
 Coordination and formulation of a Metropolitan Action Plan for environment, health and biodiversity protection, and measures to fight against climate change, and formulation of a metropolitan 21 Agenda.•
 Participation in the production of acoustic capacity and strategic noise maps.
 Issue of environmental reports.
 Collaboration with municipalities in environmental planning policies.
 Development and management of renewable energy facilities.

Housing 
The AMB exercises its powers in land and housing policies established by the urban legislation. It does so by delegation of metropolitan municipalities and to ensure intermunicipal solidarity in these actions.
 The AMB defines land and housing policies, within the Metropolitan Urban Master Plan, with the aim of ensuring intermunicipal solidarity in these actions and exercising the constitutional right to housing.
 The AMB exercises its powers in land and housing policies as laid down by the urban legislation, delegated by metropolitan municipalities.
 The AMB carries out territorial planning actions to assign land to industrial and tertiary uses; promotes affordable housing, and is responsible for the construction of public equipments commissioned by metropolitan municipalities.
 Similarly, the metropolitan administration exercises its powers in housing as recognised by law and those delegated by agreement or via consortium.

Economic development 
The AMB aims to promote economic activity, employment and entrepreneurship in the areas of industry, trade, services and tourism resources.
 Promotion of economic activity, employment and entrepreneurship in the areas of industry, trade, services and tourism resources.
 Promotion of a Strategic Metropolitan Plan for modernisation, research and innovation.

Social cohesion 
Social cohesion is one of the objectives of the creation of the AMB and is the principle by which all policies concerning urban planning, transport, environment, infrastructures and assistance to metropolitan municipalities are defined.

The aim is to achieve a cohesive and united metropolitan development, in which the benefits and costs of living in the metropolitan area are equally distributed among its inhabitants, regardless of the municipality in which they live.

To fulfil this aim, the powers of the AMB also include the following:
 Promotion of pluri-municipal policies enhancing social cohesion and territorial balance.
 Participation in the Safety Commission of the metropolitan territorial area in order to promote civic coexistence policies.

Geography
The Àrea Metropolitana de Barcelona is set on the central Catalan Coast and around the capital. The metropolitan area can be divided into two zones:

 The boundary zone forming the conurbation with the city of Barcelona itself. Bordered by the Mediterranean Sea and the Serra de Collserola, the towns in this zone are Badalona, Hospitalet de Llobregat, Santa Coloma de Gramenet and Cornellà de Llobregat. Here the boundaries between municipalities are set by streets, avenues or the Llobregat and Besòs rivers.
 The adjacent metropolitan zone, made up of several towns surrounded by predominantly residential suburban areas with detached, semi-detached and terraced housing, industrial estates, parkland and woods, such as Sant Vicenç dels Horts, Sant Cugat del Vallès and Cerdanyola del Vallès.

AMB Municipalities

Municipal elections 2015 

* ICV-E included in the 2015 coalitions in Comú Badia - Entesa i Barcelona Comú - Entesa.

** Guanyem not included in the 2015 coalitions in Comú Badia - Entesa and Barcelona Comú - Entesa.

Metropolitan government

Metropolitan Council 
The Metropolitan Council is the highest governing body of the AMB. Its responsibilities include the appointment and dismissal of the AMB presidency; the approval of the Metropolitan Action Plan, which includes projects and services developed by the AMB during the term; the approval of laws and regulations, as well as the establishment of the metropolitan services fees.

The Metropolitan Council currently comprises 90 metropolitan councillors. Each of the 36 municipalities has a number of members in proportion to their demographic weight. The mayors of the municipalities are ex officio members of the Council, in addition to the councillors appointed by the Town Councils whose number increases until covering the one stipulated for each municipality.

Governing Board 
The Governing Board is the body that assists the president in the everyday work of the metropolitan administration.

Tasks are delegated by the Metropolitan Council and the president, with the aim of facilitating the decision making and the work of the metropolitan administration.

The Governing Board comprises the AMB president and the metropolitan councillors appointed by the president at the proposal of the Metropolitan Council, and it meets at least twice a month.

Members of the Governing Board 2015 - 2019

See also 
Barcelona metropolitan area
Catalonia
Comarques of Catalonia
Local government in Spain

References

External links
Àrea Metropolitana de Barcelona 

Metropolitan areas of Spain
Geography of Barcelona